= Chips Way =

Food manufacturing company in Serbia

Chips Way D.O.O
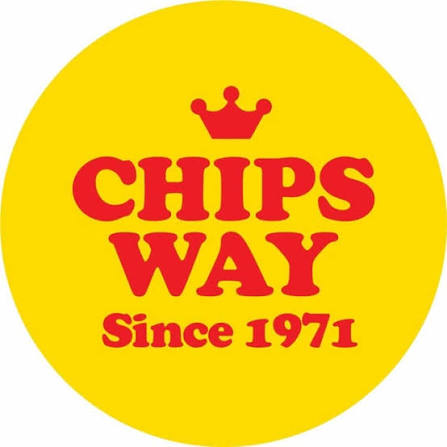
- Type: Private
- Industry: Food processing
- Founded: 1971
- Area served: Central and Eastern Europe
- Products: Čačanski čips
- Website: chipsway.rs

Chips Way is a potato chips company was established in 1971 in Čačak, Serbia.

== History ==
The company was established in 1971 in Čačak, Serbia, then part of the Socialist Federal Republic of Yugoslavia. It was constructed as the first and only domestic potato chip factory in the country. Under the socialized economy, it operated as a primary processor of agricultural goods from the surrounding Moravica District, quickly making its primary product, Čačanski čips, a household name across the Yugoslav republics.

=== Privatization and financial distress ===
Following the breakup of Yugoslavia and economic transitions in Serbia, the state-owned enterprise underwent structural changes. It was eventually privatized, operating under corporate umbrellas like Slap Group. However, the company faced prolonged financial mismanagement and unstable market shifts. These issues culminated in severe liquidity crises, and the factory entered official bankruptcy proceedings in 2012, temporarily halting production and threatening the local agricultural network that relied on its supply chain.

=== Consortia rescue and modern era ===
In 2013, a consortium of domestic investors purchased the assets out of bankruptcy, renaming and restructuring the business into Chips Way d.o.o. This revival brought much-needed technological updates to the Čačak facility. By 2022, major regional conglomerates, including Integral Venture Partners and the Nelt Group, acquired ownership stakes in the company. This institutional backing launched a €20 million investment cycle, completed between 2022 and 2024. The expansion added fully automated packaging lines, upgraded to sustainable infrastructure via 1,000 factory-roof solar panels and expanded industrial export distribution to more than 10 European markets.

== Operations and export markets ==
Chips Way supplies its products across a domestic network in Serbia and exports to over 10 European nations. While its primary manufacturing facility and agricultural supply chain of 450 hectares are located in Serbia, the company utilizes regional distributors—including the co-owning Nelt Group—to supply international grocery markets in Montenegro, Bosnia and Herzegovina, North Macedonia, Croatia, Slovenia, Romania, Hungary, Bulgaria and Moldova.
